Hilshire Village is a city in Harris County, Texas, United States. The population was 816 at the 2020 census. The city is the smallest of the Memorial Villages in terms of area.

As of 2000, Hilshire Village was the 10th wealthiest location in Texas by per capita income.

History
In the 1940s Frank Bruess and his mother left Missouri, entered Texas, and purchased  of land in his new state. Bruess read about a country estate in Hillshire, England; he liked this name and called his development "Hilshire Village" with one "L." By the early 1950s construction of Hilshire Village began.

In the mid-1950s, effort to form a Spring Branch municipality failed. Hilshire Village incorporated on April 15, 1955. Because of the 1955 incorporation, Houston did not incorporate Hilshire Village's territory into its city limits, while Houston annexed surrounding areas that were unincorporated. In 1960 543 people lived in Hilshire Village. In 1970 627 residents lived in Hilshire Village. By the 1990s the population grew to 665 residents. During that period some people demolished older homes and replaced them with newer homes.

Geography

Hilshire Village is located at  (29.790394, –95.488178).

Demographics

As of the 2020 United States census, there were 816 people, 319 households, and 274 families residing in the city. The median household income was $220,398. 

As of the census of 2000, there were 720 people, 286 households, and 227 families residing in the city. The population density was 2,661.0 people per square mile (1,029.6/km2). There were 292 housing units at an average density of 1,079.2 per square mile (417.6/km2). The racial makeup of the city was 93.89% White, 0.42% African American, 0.14% Native American, 3.33% Asian, 0.42% from other races, and 1.81% from two or more races. Hispanic or Latino of any race were 4.17% of the population.

There were 286 households, out of which 33.6% had children under the age of 18 living with them, 69.9% were married couples living together, 6.6% had a female householder with no husband present, and 20.3% were non-families. 17.1% of all households were made up of individuals, and 11.9% had someone living alone who was 65 years of age or older. The average household size was 2.52 and the average family size was 2.83.

In the city, the population was spread out, with 24.0% under the age of 18, 2.1% from 18 to 24, 21.9% from 25 to 44, 34.3% from 45 to 64, and 17.6% who were 65 years of age or older. The median age was 46 years. For every 100 females, there were 89.5 males. For every 100 females age 18 and over, there were 86.7 males.

The median income for a household in the city was $117,252, and the median income for a family was $129,025. Males had a median income of $90,402 versus $61,875 for females. The per capita income for the city was $66,620. About 3.0% of families and 2.5% of the population were below the poverty line, including 4.1% of those under age 18 and 2.6% of those age 65 or over.

Government and infrastructure

The city has a mayor-council form of government. The Village Fire Department serves all of the Memorial villages.

The Spring Valley Police Department serves Hilshire Village.

Harris County Precinct Three, headed by Tom Ramsey as of 2022, serves Hilshire Village.

Hilshire Village is located in Texas House of Representatives, District 133 of the Texas House of Representatives. As of 2022 Jim Murphy represents the district. Hilshire Village is within District 17 of the Texas Senate; as of 2022 Joan Huffman represents the district.

Hilshire Village is in Texas's 7th congressional district; as of 2022, Democrat Lizzie Pannill Fletcher is the representative.

The United States Postal Service uses "Houston" for all Hilshire Village addresses; "Hilshire Village" is not an acceptable city designation for mail addressed to areas in Hilshire Village .

Harris Health System (formerly Harris County Hospital District) designated Northwest Health Center for ZIP code 77055. The nearest public hospital is Ben Taub General Hospital in the Texas Medical Center.

Education

Primary and secondary schools

Public schools

Hilshire Village is served by Spring Branch Independent School District. Hilshire Village is zoned to Bear Boulevard School in Spring Valley Village, Valley Oaks Elementary School in Spring Branch, Houston, Spring Branch Middle School in Hedwig Village, and Memorial High School in Hedwig Village.

Private schools

School of the Woods is located in Hilshire Village. and one of the two campuses of The Monarch School were previously there, but the school planned to move out of its Hilshire Village campus and its campus in the Houston city limits into a new campus in the Houston city limits in August 2008.

The Roman Catholic Archdiocese of Galveston-Houston operates St. Cecilia School, a K–8 Roman Catholic school, in nearby Hedwig Village. The Kinkaid School, a K–12 private school, is located in Piney Point Village.

Colleges and universities

Spring Branch ISD (and therefore Hilshire Village) is served by the Houston Community College System. The Northwest College operates the nearby Spring Branch Campus in Houston.

Public libraries

It is served by the Spring Branch Memorial Branch of Harris County Public Library (the Spring Branch Memorial Branch is in Hedwig Village).

Media
The Houston Chronicle is the area regional newspaper.

The Memorial Examiner is a local newspaper distributed in the community .

Postal services
The closest United States Postal Service location is the Long Point Post Office at 	
8000 Long Point Road, Houston, Texas, 77055-9998.

See also

References

External links
 City of Hilshire Village official website
 

Cities in Harris County, Texas
Cities in Texas
Greater Houston